Victoria Woodcock was the operations director for the Vote Leave campaign for the 2016 referendum vote for the United Kingdom to leave the European Union.  Dominic Cummings and Paul Goodman claim Woodcock was a key person to the success of the Vote Leave campaign for Brexit.

Biography

Early life
Woodcock was born in 1987.  She began her post-school studies at the University of Southampton in 2005 and achieved a BSc degree in sociology and social policy in 2008.  She went on to complete an MSc in social statistics in 2010.

Government
Woodcock's early career was as a civil servant in the Department of Education, where she worked on a variety of policies including schools, academies and the spending review.  She became private secretary to the secretary of state and then took a role as strategic analyst.  From 2014 she worked for a while as adviser to the Government Chief Whip.  From 2015 she advised the head of strategic events, delivering and coordinating the 2015 VE Day 70th anniversary celebrations.

Vote Leave
Woodcock was both the company secretary and operations director for the Vote Leave campaign.  Dominic Cummings has credited Woodcock with being the most indispensable person in the campaign.  Woodcock was responsible for managing the creation of the Voter Intention Collection System (VICS), a bespoke canvassing software system used to model and target the campaign.  She has been described as pivotal to the running of Vote Leave, and noted for not seeking the limelight.

In March 2017, with the Electoral Commission opening an investigation into particular donations relating to Vote Leave, an account by the name Victoria Woodcock deleted computer files useful to the investigation from the shared drive.  Woodcock stated in June 2018 that the account was an administrative one that she had used to set up the drive and that she had handed over access to Vote Leave on 17 March 2017 at a point in time prior to the deletions taking place and did not have access to the drive at that time.  Paul Goodman, blogging in Conservative Home, also claims Woodcock was responsible at the last minute for identifying that Vote Leave's application to run the leave campaign had not been drafted against the assessed criteria, and without a rewrite against that criteria Vote Leave would have lost out against BeLeave with, in Goodman's opinion, the consequence that Britain Stronger in Europe would have prevailed to keep the United Kingdom in the European Union.

In the 2019 drama Brexit: The Uncivil War, which depicted the activity of the Vote Leave campaign, Woodcock was played by Kate O'Flynn.

Subsequent career
Woodcock moved on to become programme director at the software company Sage.

References

 
 
 
 
 
 
 
 
 

Brexit
Alumni of the University of Southampton
Living people
1987 births